Roberts Rode (born 29 May 1987 in Riga) is an alpine skier from Latvia.  He competed for Latvia at the 2010 Winter Olympics.  His best finish was a 58th place in the downhill.

References

External links
 
 
 

1987 births
Living people
Sportspeople from Riga
Latvian male alpine skiers
Olympic alpine skiers of Latvia
Alpine skiers at the 2010 Winter Olympics
Alpine skiers at the 2014 Winter Olympics